Château des Cailloux is a castle in Jodoigne, Wallonia, Belgium. It was built in a neo-renaissance style in 1881–1883. After a fire in 1952, the roof was rebuilt in a more simple fashion.

See also
List of castles in Belgium

References

External links
Château des Cailloux website

Cailloux
Cailloux
Renaissance Revival architecture in Belgium
Jodoigne